This is a list of Justice Ministers of Romania. The first person to hold office was Manolache Costache Epureanu.

United Romanian Principalities (1859–1862) 
 Manolache Costache Epureanu - January 17, 1859  (Iași), April 27, 1859 (Iași, Chairman of the Council of Ministers, Minister of Justice and Finance Ad interim)
  - January 25, 1859 (Bucharest, President of the Council of Ministers and Minister of Justice)
  - 8 March 1859 (Iași), January 17, 1861 (Iași)
 Ion C. Cantacuzino - 27 March 1859 (Bucharest), 6 September 1859 (Bucharest, and temporary religions), 5 October 1861 (Iași, Minister of Interior and Justice ad-interim), 19 July 1861 (Bucharest)
  - October 6, 1859 (Bucharest, the holder of Ion C. Cantacuzino resigning), October 11, 1859 (Bucharest, ad interim)
  - November 10, 1859 (Iași)
 Gheorghe Apostoleanu - 30 March 1860 (Iași, ad interim, Dimitrie Scarlat Miclescu resigning)
 Damaschin Bojincă - April 30, 1860 (Iași)
 Vasile Boerescu - May 28, 1860 (Bucharest, July 13, 1860 and Ad-interim at the Cults), November 17, 1868
 Nicolae Bițcoveanu - April 11, 1861 (Bucharest  ad interim following the resignation of Vasile Boerescu)
  - January 17, 1861 (Iași)
  - May 23, 1861 (Iași) (replacing Constantin Hurmuzachi, resigned)
 Constantin N. Brăiloiu - April 30, 1861 (Bucharest), January 22, 1862
  - May 12, 1861 (Bucharest)
 Dimitrie Ghica - July 30, 1861 (ad interim as missing Ion C. Cantacuzino), January 21, 1870 (interim in place of Vasile Boerescu, resigned)

Romania (1862–1881)
 Apostol Arsache - October 21, 1861 (ad interim following the resignation of IC Cantacuzino)
 Dimitrie Cornea - June 7, 1862
 Nicolae Crețulescu - December 30, 1862, July 3, 1862, August 8, 1863 (28 days in advance and August after the resignation of Barbu Bellu), June 19, 1864, March 11, 1871
 Barbu Bellu - June 14, 1863
 Dimitrie P. Vioreanu - August 15, 1863, February 2, 1870, April 5, 1876
 Alexandru Papiu Ilarian - October 11, 1863
 P. Orbescu - 1 March 1864 (ad interim), 6 May 1864
 Grigore Bengescu - January 21, 1865
 George D. Vernescu - January 26, 1865
 Dimitrie Cariagdi - June 14, 1865, December 18, 1870
 Ioan Cantacuzino - February 11, 1866
 Constantin A. Crețulescu - March 1, 1867
 Ștefan Golescu - August 5, 1867 (ad interim)
 Anton I. Arion - August 17, 1867, November 13, 1867
 Constantin Eraclide - November 3, 1868
 Gheorghe Grigore Cantacuzino - January 24, 1870
 Alexandru Lahovary - April 20, 1870, October 4, 1873
 Gheorghe Costaforu - June 8, 1871
 Manolache Costache Epureanu - October 28, 1872
 Christian Tell - March 31, 1873 (ad interim)
 Mihail Pherekyde - April 27, 1876, April 9, 1871
 Eugeniu Stătescu - 24 July 1876, 16 November 1881 (ad interim), 1 August 1882, 16 December 1885, 4 October 1895, 8 July 1902
 Ion I. Câmpineanu - January 27, 1877
 Anastase Stolojan - July 11, 1879, January 5, 1898

Kingdom of Romania (1881–1947) 
 Dimitrie Gianni - July 9, 1880, March 1, 1888
 Gheorghe Chițu - January 25, 1882, October 1, 1883 (ad interim)
 Nicolae Voinov - November 15, 1883
 Constantin Nacu - February 2, 1885
 Alexandru Marghiloman - March 23, 1888
 George D. Vernescu - November 12, 1888, February 21, 1891 (ad interim)
 Nicolae Gherassi - March 29, 1889
 Theodor Rosetti - November 5, 1889
 Grigore Trandafil - November 16, 1890
 Nicolae Blaremberg - November 3, 1891
 Dimitrie C. Sturdza-Scheianu - November 27, 1891
 Ștefan C. Șendrea - November 22, 1896
 Alexandru Djuvara - March 31, 1897
 George D. Pallade - January 12, 1898
 Constantin Stoicescu - October 1, 1898, February 14, 1901
 Constantin Dissescu - April 11, 1899
 Titu Maiorescu - July 7, 1900
 Alexandru Gianni - October 19, 1903
 Alexandru Bădărău - December 22, 1904
  - June 5, 1906
  - March 12, 1907
 Mihail G. Cantacuzino - December 29, 1910, December 11, 1916
 Victor Antonescu - January 4, 1914, November 14, 1933, January 5, 1934, October 2, 1934
 Constantin Argetoianu - January 29, 1918, March 13, 1920 (ad interim)
 Dimitrie Dobrescu - March 16, 1918
 Ion Mitilineu - June 4, 1918
 Artur Văitoianu - October 24, 1918 (Ad-interim, Army Corps General)
 Dumitru Buzdugan - October 28, 1918
 Em. Miclescu - September 27, 1919
 Ion Pelivan - December 5, 1919 (did not work, being delegated to the Peace Commission in Paris, the interim was held by Ștefan Cicio Pop, State Minister)
 Matei B. Cantacuzino - March 31, 1920
  - August 27, 1920 (ad interim), November 16, 1920
 Take Ionescu - December 9, 1920 (ad interim)
 Mihail Antonescu - January 1, 1921
 Stelian Popescu - December 17, 1921, June 4, 1927
 Ioan Theodor Florescu - January 19, 1922
 Gheorghe Gh. Mârzescu - October 29, 1923
 Teodor Cudalbu - March 30, 1926
 Grigore Iunian - November 10, 1928, June 13, 1930, October 10, 1930
  - 7 March 1930, 7 June 1930, 6 December 1930
 Gheorghe Mironescu - June 7, 1930 (ad interim)
 Constantin Hamangiu - April 18, 1931
 Victor Vâlcovici - January 7, 1932
  - January 9, 1932 , February 1, 1935
 Virgil Potârcă - June 6, 1932
 Mihai Popovici - August 11, 1932 , October 20, 1932, January 14, 1933, September 22, 1933
 Emil Hațieganu - July 22, 1933 (ad interim)
  - August 29, 1936
 Vasile P. Sassu - February 23, 1937
 Vasile Rădulescu Mehedinți - December 29, 1937
  - February 11, 1938 (ad interim)
 Victor Iamandi - March 30, 1938
 Istrate Micescu - November 24, 1939
  - November 30, 1939
 Ion V. Gruia - July 4, 1940
 Mihai Antonescu - September 14, 1940
  - January 27, 1941
 Constantin Stoicescu - February 15, 1941
 Ion C. Marinescu - August 14, 1942
 Lucrețiu Pătrășcanu - August 23, 1944 (ad interim), November 4, 1944
 Ion Boițeanu - 1 September 1944 (ad interim)
  - September 7, 1944 (replacing Lucrețiu Pătrășcanu, resigned)
  - October 4, 1944 (ad interim, Aureliu Căpățână resigning)

Communist Romania (1948–1989)
 Avram Bunaciu - April 15, 1948 , December 31, 1957
  - September 24, 1949
  - January 28, 1953
 Gheorghe Diaconescu - May 31, 1954, January 23, 1958
 Ion Constantin Manoliu - March 21, 1961
 Adrian Dumitriu - March 18, 1965
 Teodor Vasiliu - November 28, 1970
 Emil Nicolcioiu - March 18, 1975
  - January 26, 1977
  - October 24, 1979
  - March 29, 1980
 Gheorghe Chivulescu - January 23, 1982
 Maria Bobu - October 3, 1987

Post-Communist Romania (1989–present)
  - January 3, 1990
 Victor Babiuc - June 28, 1990
 Mircea Ionescu-Quintus - October 16, 1991
  - November 19, 1992
 Iosif Gavril Chiuzbaian - March 6, 1994
 Ion Predescu - September 3, 1996
 Valeriu Stoica 12 December 1996 – 28 December 2000
 Rodica Stănoiu 28 December 2000 – 10 March 2004
 Cristian Diaconescu 10 March 2004 – 28 December 2004
 Monica Macovei 18 December 2004 – 5 April 2007
 Tudor Chiuariu 5 April 2007 – 10 December 2007
 Teodor Meleșcanu (ad interim) 15 January 2008 – 29 February 2008
 Cătălin Predoiu 29 February 2008 – 7 May 2012
 Titus Corlățean 7 May 2012 – 6 August 2012
  23 August 2012 – 28 March 2013
 Victor Ponta (acting) 28 March 2013 – 15 April 2013
  15 April 2013 – 17 November 2015
  17 November 2015 – 4 January 2017
 Florin Iordache 4 January 2017 – 9 February 2017
 Ana Birchall (acting) 9 February 2017 – 22 February 2017
 Tudorel Toader 23 February 2017 - 18 April 2019
 Ana Birchall 7 June 2019 - 4 November 2019
 Cătălin Predoiu 4 November 2019 - 23 December 2020
 Stelian Ion 23 December 2020 - 2 September 2021
 Lucian Bode (acting) 2 September 2021 - 25 November 2021
 Cătălin Predoiu 25 November 2021 - incumbent

See also
 Government of Romania
 Justice ministry
 Politics of Romania
 Romanian judicial reform

References

External links
 Ministry of Justice
 
 Government of Romania

Justice
Politics of Romania
Romania